Heinz Hunsdiecker (22 January 1904 – 22 November 1981) was a German chemist who together with his wife Claire Hunsdiecker (1903–1995) improved a reaction of Alexander Borodin now known as the Hunsdiecker reaction.

References

1904 births
1981 deaths
20th-century German chemists